Cinderelas, lobos e um príncipe encantado (English: Cinderellas, Wolves and A Prince Charming) is a 2008 Brazilian documentary film directed by Joel Zito Araújo.

Synopsis 
Around 900,000 people are trafficked through international borders every year with a single purpose: sexual exploitation. However, even with all the struggles and dangers, young Brazilian women still believe in the possibility of changing their lives and finding their enchanted prince as they are submerged into the work of sexual tourism. Only a tiny minority ever manages to find a soul mate and get married. The film journeys from the northeast of Brazil to Berlin seeking to understand the sexual, racial, and power imaginary of the young Cinderellas from the south and the wolves from the north.

References

External links

Brazilian documentary films
2009 documentary films
2009 films
Creative Commons-licensed documentary films
Documentary films about prostitution
Films about prostitution in Brazil